Corsindae House is a 16th-century castle, originally L-plan, about  north of Banchory, Aberdeenshire, Scotland, and  north of Midmar.

History
The castle, built around 1580, was a property of the Sinclairs, of whom John Forbes was accused of murder in 1605.  Corsindae Castle is still lived in.
There have been several additions, including one thought to be by Lord Braco in 1726, up to 1840.

Structure
Corsindae House comprises a L-plan tower house with three storeys and an attic.  In the re-entrant angle is a round stair tower.  A large mansion has been added, so that the whole is now U-plan.  All is harled and whitewashed.
There is a vaulted basement.

See also
Castles in Great Britain and Ireland
List of castles in Scotland

References

Castles in Aberdeenshire